This page presents the works of the French author Paul Claudel (1868 – 1955), one-time French ambassador to the United States and Brazil.

Works 
Theatre

 1887 : L'Endormie (first version)
 1888 : Fragment d'un drame
 1890 : Tête d'or (first version)
 1892 : La Jeune Fille Violaine (first version)
 1893 : La Ville (first version) The City
 1894 : Tête d'or (second version) ; L'Échange (first version)
 1899 : La Jeune Fille Violaine (second version)
 1901 : La Ville (second version)
 1901 : Le Repos du septième jour
 1906 : Partage de midi Break of Noon, drama (first version) 
 1911 : L'Otage, The Hostage drama in three acts
 1912 : L'Annonce faite à Marie The Annunciation of Mary (first version)
 1913 : Protée, 2-act satirical drama (first version)
 1917 : L'Ours et la Lune
 1918 : Le Pain dur, drama in three acts
 1919 : Les Choéphores d'Eschyle
 1920 : Le Père humilié, drama in four acts
 1920 : Les Euménides d'Eschyle
 1926 : Protée, 2-act satirical drama (second version)
 1927 : Sous le Rempart d'Athènes
 1929 : The Satin Slipper, action espagnole en quatre journées (créé partiellement in 1943 by Jean-Louis Barrault, en version intégrale at the théâtre d'Orsay in 1980; la version intégrale a été reprise in 1987 by Antoine Vitez)
 1933 : Le Livre de Christophe Colomb, The Book of Christopher Columbus lyrical drama in two parts
 1939 : Jeanne d'Arc au bûcher
 1939 : La Sagesse ou la Parabole du destin
 1942 : L'Histoire de Tobie et de Sara, morality in three acts
 1947 : L'Endormie (second version)
 1948 : L'Annonce faite à Marie (second version)
 1949 : Protée, 2-act satirical drama (second version)
 1954 : L'Échange (second version)

 
Poetry
 1900, then 1907 (2nd éd.): Connaissance de l'Est The East I Know
 1905 : Poèmes de la Sexagésime 
 1907 : Processionnal pour saluer le siècle nouveau
 1911 : Cinq grandes Odes Five Great Odes
 1911 : Le Chemin de la Croix
 1911–1912 : La Cantate à trois voix
 1915 : Corona benignitatis anni dei 
 1919 : La Messe là-bas 
 1922 : Poèmes de guerre (1914-1916) Three Poems of the War
 1925 : Feuilles de saints 
 1942 : Cent phrases pour éventails A Hundred Movements for a Fan
 1945 : Visages radieux 
 1945 : Dodoitzu, illustrations by Rihakou Harada.
 1949 : Accompagnements 
Essais
 1928 : Positions et propositions, tome I
 1929 : L'Oiseau noir dans le soleil levant
 1934 : Positions et propositions, tome II
 1935 : Conversations dans le Loir-et-Cher
 1936 : Figures et paraboles
 1940 : Contacts et circonstances
 1942 : Seigneur, apprenez-nous à prier
 1946 : L'œil écoute The Eye Listens
 1949 : Emmaüs
 1950 : Une voix sur Israël
 1951 : L'Évangile d'Isaïe
 1952 : Paul Claudel interroge l'Apocalypse
 1954 : Paul Claudel interroge le Cantique des Cantiques
 1955 : J'aime la Bible, Fayard I Believe in God
 1956 : Conversation sur Jean Racine
 1957 : Sous le signe du dragon
 1958 : Qui ne souffre pas... Réflexions sur le problème social
 1958 : Présence et prophétie
 1959 : La Rose et le rosaire
 1959 : Trois figures saintes pour le temps actuel
[[File:Paul Claudel on TIME Magazine, March 21, 1927.jpg|thumb|Paul Claudel, French ambassador at Washington. Time Magazine''' cover, 21 March 1927]]
Memories, diary
 1954 : Mémoires improvisés. Quarante et un entretiens with Jean Amrouche 1968 : Journal. Tome I : 1904-1932 1969 : Journal. Tome II : 1933-1955Correspondence
 1949 : Correspondance de Paul Claudel et André Gide (1899-1926) 1951 : Correspondance de Paul Claudel et André Suarès (1904-1938) 1952 : Correspondance de Paul Claudel with Gabriel Frizeau and Francis Jammes (1897-1938), accompagnée de lettres de Jacques Rivière
 1961 : Correspondance Paul Claudel et Darius Milhaud (1912-1953)
 1964 : Correspondance de Paul Claudel et Lugné-Poe (1910-1928). Claudel homme de théâtre 1966 : Correspondences avec Copeau, Dullin, Jouvet. Claudel homme de théâtre 1974 : Correspondance de Jean-Louis Barrault et Paul Claudel 1984 : Correspondance de Paul Claudel et Jacques Rivière (1907-1924) 1990 : Lettres de Paul Claudel à Élisabeth Sainte-Marie Perrin et à Audrey Parr 1995 : Correspondence diplomatique. Tokyo (1921-1927) 1995 : Correspondance de Paul Claudel et Gaston Gallimard (1911-1954) 1996: Paul Claudel, Jacques Madaule Connaissance et reconnaissance : Correspondence 1929-1954, DDB
 1998 : Le Poète et la Bible, volume 1, 1910-1946, Gallimard, coll. « Blanche »
 2002 : Le Poète et la Bible, volume 2, 1945-1955, Gallimard, coll. « Blanche »
 2004 : Lettres de Paul Claudel à Jean Paulhan (1925-1954), Correspondance présentée et annotée par Catherine Mayaux, Berne : Paul Lang, 2004 
 2005 : Correspondance de Paul Claudel avec les ecclésiastiques de son temps. Volume I, Le sacrement du monde et l'intention de gloire, éditée par Dominique Millet-Gérard, Paris : Champion, coll. « Bibliothèque des correspondances, mémoires et journaux » n° 19, 2005, 655 p. .
 2005 : Une Amitié perdue et retrouvée. Correspondance de Paul Claudel et Romain Rolland'', édition établie, annotée et présentée par Gérald Antoine et Bernard Duchatelet, Paris : Gallimard, coll. « Les cahiers de la NRF », 2005, 479 p.

References

Theatre in France
French literature
French literature-related lists
French culture-related lists